Physoplexis comosa, the tufted horned rampion, is a species of flowering plant in the family Campanulaceae, native to alpine Europe. It is the only species in its genus, and was formerly included in Phyteuma.<ref>{{cite web|title=Alpine Garden Society - Physoplexis comosa |url=http://encyclopaedia.alpinegardensociety.net/plants/Physoplexis|accessdate=30 June 2013}}</ref>

The specific epithet comosa'' means "tufted".

In cultivation it is suitable for the rockery or alpine garden, and has gained the Royal Horticultural Society's Award of Garden Merit.

References

Campanuloideae
Alpine flora
Perennial plants
Flora of Europe
Flora of the Alps
Monotypic Campanulaceae genera